Menengai Crater is a massive shield volcano with one of the biggest calderas in the world, in the Great Rift Valley, Kenya. It is the largest volcano caldera in Kenya and the second largest volcano caldera in Africa. Volcanic formed rich loam soils enrich the adjacent farmland arounds its flanks. 
The crater is on the floor of the Rift Valley. The volcano formed about 200,000 years ago and the prominent 12 x 8 km caldera formed about 8000 years ago. The caldera floor is covered with numerous post caldera lava flows.  
The Menengai volcano is considered one of the best-preserved Krakatau-style calderas in the world. 
Menengai has very little sediment in the caldera which is a thick mass of lava boulders and inaccessible ridges.
 Volcanic activity continues  and a current project under the GDC is at an advanced stage  towards geothermal power generation.

See also
 List of volcanoes in Kenya
 Menengai Forest

References

See also
 

Mountains of Kenya
Volcanoes of Kenya
Polygenetic shield volcanoes
Nakuru
Nakuru County
VEI-6 volcanoes
Holocene shield volcanoes
Volcanoes of the Great Rift Valley
Calderas of Kenya